Sabotage at the General Post Office in Zagreb took place during the Second World War on Sunday, 14 September 1941. Zagreb was the capital city of the Independent State of Croatia (NDH), a puppet state of Nazi Germany.

At exactly 12.30 p.m. two muffled explosions were heard, all glass in the main post office building was broken, and through the window flew out a large quantity of office paper and all kinds of documents.

On the second day came out in the Ustaša daily news paper Hrvatski narod, an official notice about the event at the General Post Office: "On 14 September this year at a time between 12:30-13 hours, four bombs exploded in the main post building in the department of telegrams and telephone. Eight people are injured, on this occasion, including two German soldiers and one officer and several policemen. Police clerk Škunca died of their wounds..."

Background 
The sabotage was organized and conducted at the initiative of the Central Committee of the Communist Party of Croatia, by general secretary Rade Končar  personally. Performance was entrusted to the Local Committee members: Blaž Mesarić, Antun Biber, Vojo Kovačević, Ante Milković (last two were arrested shortly before the explosion). Technical preparations are made by postal employees: Josip Čuljat, Slavko Markon, Vilim Galjer, and Nada Galjer. Čuljat and Markon were the mechanics in the Post office, the first - on the city phone automatic exchanges devices, the other - on high frequency special devices for long distance cals. Both were young men twenty-year-old and members of SKOJ.

Explosion 
This group had already developed a plan of sabotage and exercised the necessary preparations during the night services. Special custom made tin boxes for explosives, they are made by locksmith Ivan Brumen, a supporter of the Communist Party and partisans resistance movement. Through resistance movements sympathizer Lieutenant of Croatian Home Guard - Augustinović, they reached amount of explosives. He purchased (and stole) the required amount of explosives from a military magazine and gave him to Mesarić.

The big problem was how to bring 21 kilograms of trinitrotoluene into the building, because main Post office was under constant guard of Ustasha and Germans soldiers. The problem was solved so that they themselves sent a package, three days before the sabotage. The package was received by Slavko Markon on 12 September, who placed it in a handy magazine, near to automatic exchanges facilities.

Slavko Markon, Josip Čuljat and Nada Galjer (telephone operator) were able somehow to  adjust their attendance so that all three are found in service on Saturday night at pm. They began work immediately. There were seven boxes of explosives. In each of these seven boxes installed were all the necessary parts for the electrical ignition. When it was done, boxes were placed first in three of the automatic switchboards facilities and later on two long distance high frequency facilities that were on the lower floor and another in two places in the so-called splitter facility.

Department of high-frequency devices was constantly guard by a German soldier with the two duty mechanics. The Nazis were very interested in this department because there were special German devices to maintain telephone links with Vienna, Berlin, Belgrade and Athens, and  through them went cables from Berlin to Odessa and Sofia.

It was therefore necessary to disable German soldier, because in his presence they could not mount the explosive devices. Problem with a soldier they resolved so that he drank a good bottle of brandy that was brought by Čuljat, then he slept all night dead drunk.

At seven in the morning everything was prepared for the explosion. At eight in the morning Čuljat, Markon, Galjer and other participants in the organization of sabotage that had to be compromised, went by train to Karlovac to switch to Kordun and than had to Yugoslav Partisans.

On Sunday at 12.30 a.m. in the apartment of Professor Olga Milčinović, Nikola Rupčić which given the task from Anton Biber, - raised the phone, dialed preferred number and with that activated the detonation.

After the explosion a lot of police officers ran into the building, in order to prevent a possible second explosion. They issued a command to disconnect all of the building from electrical power, even from the reserve power battery pack. In this way they caused another explosion. Due to an error during installation, one of the seven explosive devices did not explode.

Sabotage caused heavy damage to the telephone facilities at the General Post Office in Zagreb, and several-hour interruption of telephone communications with Vienna, Berlin, Belgrade, Odessa and Sofia. Telephone facilities were repaired in almost seven months. On the site, police clerk was killed, while the five agents of the Ustasha, two German soldiers and one German officer were wounded. None of the postal officials and civilian persons were injured.

Aftermath 

On Wednesday 17 September  a warrant was issued for the perpetrators of this action, Josip Čuljat, Slavko Markon, Vilim Galjer and Nada Galjer and printed in the form of large posters in several hundred thousand copies, which were deployed in all public places in Independent State of Croatia.

After the war, film director Ivo Lukas made a film about this event in 1961 entitled Diverzija na telefonsku centralu (Diversion to a telephone switchboard). An episode of the 1981 TV series Nepokoreni grad, titled "72 - 96", is also based on the event.

References 

Yugoslavia in World War II
Yugoslav Resistance
Independent State of Croatia
World War II sabotage
1940s in Zagreb
September 1941 events
Yugoslav Partisans